Karne parah (Hebrew: , also spelled Qarnei Farah and other variant English spellings) is a cantillation mark found only once in the entire Torah (Book of Numbers Numbers] 35:5), and once in the Book of Esther, immediately following the identically unique Yerach ben yomo.

The symbol of the Karne para is that of the Telisha ketana and gedola together. The melody, likewise, is that of these two more common cantillation sounds put together.

The Hebrew words קַרְנֵי פָרָ֟ה translate into English as cow's horns.

Purpose

A general approach
Dr. David Weisberg suggested that the yerach ben yomo + karne para phrase is meant to call to mind a midrash halakhah, a legal point in Jewish law determined from the verse.

In the Torah
In each of the phrase's four appearances, a different set of trope. The Yerach ben yomo followed by the Karne Parah is found on the first of these four instances. On the other three, respectively, are a Kadma V'Azla, a Munach Rivi'i, and a Mercha Tipcha.

This is representative of the way mitzvot are performed in real life. When one first performs a mitzvah, being a new experience, it is performed with great enthusiasm. The unusual trope signify the one-time occurrence of the mitzvah being a new experience. The second instance is on a Kadma-V'Azla, a note that is recited highly, showing that the high is still alive. The third is on a Munach-Rivi'i, a note that is going downward, showing that enthusiasm is going down. The fourth and final occurrence being on a Mercha-Tipcha, a common set that are recited in a lazy mode as if they are basically being recited without a melody, show the monotony of performing a mitzvah after performing it so many times. 

Altogether, this verse shows the importance of performing a mitzvah that must be performed regularly, despite its monotony. It is an encouragement to bring new light into each time on performs a mitzvah in order to renew the excitement, and even when one cannot do so, to perform the mitzvah regardless.

In the Book of Esther
Since the Book of Esther is read twice in a year in Orthodox tradition while the part of Masei containing this trope is read just once, the reading in the Book of Esther is actually read more often.

Total occurrences

The yerach ben yomo + karne para phrase occurs a total of 16 times according to the Leningrad Codex. They are: 
 אלפים באמה 
 ויהושע בן–נון 
 היו בן–שאול 
 ואשר על–העיר 
 הארץ הזאת 
 ואמרו אליך 
 ולאחזת העיר 
 אשר–עשה המן 
 לאלה שמיא 
 ועיניך פתוחות 
 ינער האלהים 
 היו לפנים 
 ועמסים על–החמרים 
 המשרתים את–המלך 
 לערי יהודה 
 לבני העם

Melody

References

Cantillation marks